Al Mahwit is one of the governorates of Yemen.

Geography

Adjacent governorates

 Hajjah Governorate (north)
 Al Hudaydah Governorate (west)
 Sanaa Governorate (south, east)
 'Amran Governorate (northeast)

Districts

Al Mahwit Governorate is divided into the following 9 districts. These districts are further divided into sub-districts, and then further subdivided into villages:

 Al Khabt District
 Al Mahwait District
 Al Mahwait City District
 Ar Rujum District
 At Tawilah District
 Bani Sa'd District
 Hufash District
 Milhan District
 Shibam Kawkaban District

References

 
Governorates of Yemen